Contiki can refer to:

 Contiki, an open-source operating system designed for computers with limited memory.
 Contiki Tours, a series of bus holidays operated by Contiki Holidays for 18-35s.
 Con-Tici or Kon-Tiki, an old name for the Andean deity Viracocha

See also
Kontiki (disambiguation)